Nikita Kuzmin (Ukrainian: Нікіта Кузьмін; born 23 December 1997) is a Ukrainian dancer and choreographer. He is best known for being a professional dancer on the RTL and BBC One dance competitions Let's Dance and Strictly Come Dancing. Kuzmin is also the holder of 6 Italian Championship titles.

Early and personal life
Kuzmin was born on 23 December 1997 in Kyiv, Ukraine. His family moved to Italy when Kuzmin was nine. He has an older sister, Anastasia Kuzmina who has appeared as a professional dancer on Ballando con le Stelle. He has lived in Frankfurt, Germany since the age of 18.

In March 2022, Kuzmin appeared on Lorraine to discuss his fears for his grandmother living in Ukraine following the Russian invasion of Ukraine. They were later reunited.

Career

Let's Dance

In 2020, Kuzmin became a professional dancer on the RTL dance competition, Let's Dance for the thirteenth season where he was partnered with rapper Sabrina Setlur. They were the second couple to be eliminated. Kuzmin did not return for the fourteenth season.

Strictly Come Dancing
On 26 July 2021, Kuzmin was announced as one of four new professional dancers joining the nineteenth series of Strictly Come Dancing. Upon joining the show, Kuzmin said "I've always been amazed by the magic Strictly Come Dancing brings and that no matter what country I have found myself living in, I've never missed a chance to watch it. Joining it as a professional dancer is my big chance to make some magic on the most famous dance floor. I can't wait to give it my all." Kuzmin has also previously worked for judge Motsi Mabuse's dance company in Germany. In his first season, Kuzmin was paired with Tilly Ramsay, they were eliminated from the competition in week 10. In his second season, Kuzmin was paired with Ellie Simmonds, they were eliminated from the competition in week 7.

Performances with Tilly Ramsay

 number indicates when Tilly and Nikita were at the top of the leaderboard.
 number indicates when Tilly and Nikita were at the bottom of the leaderboard.
Score given by guest judge Cynthia Erivo

Performances with Ellie Simmonds

Dance tours
In November 2022, Kuzmin announced he was to appear with Jowita Przystał at "Dancing With The Stars Weekends" 2023.

References

Living people
1997 births
Ukrainian choreographers
Ukrainian male dancers
Ukrainian expatriates in England
Ukrainian expatriates in Germany